The Venezuela leaf-toed gecko (Phyllodactylus rutteni), also known commonly as the Venezuelan leaf-toed gecko, is a species of lizard in the family Phyllodactylidae. The species is endemic to islands off the coast of Venezuela.

Etymology
The specific name, rutteni, is in honor of Dutch geologist Louis Rutten.

Geographic range
P. rutteni is found on the following Venezuelan islands: Blanquilla, Los Hermanos, La Orchila, Los Roques, and La Tortuga.

Habitat

Reproduction
P. rutteni is oviparous.

References

Further reading
Hummelinck PW (1940). "Studies on the Fauna of Curaçao, Aruba, Bonaire and the Venezuelan Islands: No. 2. A Survey of the Mammals, Lizards and Mollusks". Studies on the Fauna of Curaçao and other Caribbean Islands 1: 59–108. (Phyllodactylus rutteni, new species, p. 77).
Rivas GA, Molina CR, Ugueto GN, Barros TR, Barrio-Amorós CL, Kok PJR (2012). "Reptiles of Venezuela: an updated and commented checklist". Zootaxa 3211: 1-64.
Rösler H (2000). "Kommentierte Liste der rezent, subrezent und fossil bekannten Geckotaxa (Reptilia: Gekkonomorpha)". Gekkota 2: 28–153. (Phyllodactylus rutteni, p. 104). (in German).

Phyllodactylus
Reptiles of Venezuela
Reptiles described in 1940